Charles Ukakwe is a Nigerian professor of Counselling/Health Psychology, educational administrator and former Registrar of the National Examination Council (Nigeria). He was appointed in 2016 by Muhammadu Buhari.
 and had his appointment terminated on Wednesday May 21st, 2020.

References

Academic staff of the University of Ibadan
Living people
Year of birth missing (living people)